Chris L. Zois (commonly known as Chris Zois) is an American author of two short-term therapy books.

Early life and education
Zois graduated from Rutgers University in New Jersey with a major in philosophy. He obtained his medical degree from New York Medical College and completed a residency in psychiatry at New York Hospital.

Career
Zois is the author of two books on short term therapy: "Think Like a Shrink", a self-help book published by Warner Books; and a textbook, "Short Term Therapy Techniques", Jason Aronson Publishers. He has also written five film screenplays: Welcome to New York (2014), Chelsea on the Rocks (2008), Jersey Guy (2003), New Rose Hotel (1998), and The Blackout (1997).

He has been on the teaching faculty of three medical schools, founded the New York Center for Short Term Psychotherapy, and contributed articles on Short Term Therapy to journals.

In 2011 his license to practice medicine in New Jersey was revoked .

Relationship with Gloria Vanderbilt
Zois treated designer Gloria Vanderbilt as a patient from 1973 to 1976. In 1993, Vanderbilt won a nearly $1.7 million judgment against him and her former lawyer, Thomas A. Andrews. Vanderbilt was awarded $1,383,199.41 from Andrews's estate and $97,300 plus interest from Zois. Although Zois declared bankruptcy, courts have repeatedly affirmed that the debt to Vanderbilt is nondischargeable. He also was accused of forging Oona O'Neill's signature on a check, when she was in Switzerland recovering from a cerebral hemorrhage

Bibliography

Books
Think Like a Shrink: Solve Your Problems Yourself with Short Term Therapy Techniques  by Christ L. Zois (1992) 
Short-Term Therapy Techniques by Christ L. Zois (1997) 
Life Guard by Chris Zois (2014) published by Capricci Editions, Paris.

Games
Think Like a Shrink (iPhone)

Films
The Blackout  (1997)
New Rose Hotel (1998)
Jersey Guy  (2003)
Chelsea on the Rocks (2008)
Welcome to New York (2014)
''Siberia (2020)

External links

References

 https://books.google.com/books?id=DBoAAAAAMBAJ&pg=PA41&lpg=PA41&dq=chris+zois&source=bl&ots=qKRJ4E0i8y&sig=ACfU3U0PslvbcZJODgQkRKAGno7tJuqH-A&hl=en&sa=X&ved=2ahUKEwj_zYTHhfHiAhVLip4KHUGwAKo4FBDoATABegQICRAB#v=onepage&q=chris%20zois&f=false

American male screenwriters
American health and wellness writers
American video game designers
Living people
New York Medical College alumni
Rutgers University alumni
Year of birth missing (living people)
American male non-fiction writers
Screenwriters from New York (state)